Mariota Tiumalu Tuiasosopo (1905–1957) was the writer of "Amerika Samoa", the regional anthem of American Samoa.

References

1905 births
1957 deaths
American Samoan writers
National anthem writers